Julia Glushko was the defending champion of the Fifth Third Bank Tennis Championships, having won the event in 2012, but losing in the semifinals to Shelby Rogers in 2013. Rogers went on to win the title, defeating Julie Coin in the final, 6–4, 7–6(7–3).

Seeds

Main draw

Finals

Top half

Bottom half

References 
 Main draw

Fifth Third Bank Tennis Championships - Women's Singles
2013 WS